Ricardo Sancho (born 11 March 1942) is a Spanish former sports shooter. He competed at the 1972, 1980 and the 1984 Summer Olympics.

References

1942 births
Living people
Spanish male sport shooters
Olympic shooters of Spain
Shooters at the 1972 Summer Olympics
Shooters at the 1980 Summer Olympics
Shooters at the 1984 Summer Olympics
Sportspeople from Barcelona
20th-century Spanish people